The Preacher is a 2004 Dutch thriller film about a drug lord named Klaas Donkers. The film is based on Bart Middelburg's biography of real-life drug lord Klaas Bruinsma.

The film received a great deal of attention because it came out shortly after the Mabel Wisse Smit affair, which was caused by Dutch princess Mabel confessing to having lied to the Dutch royal family about her past relationship with Bruinsma.

Cast
 Peter Paul Muller as Klaas Donkers
 Frank Lammers as Adri Slotemaker
 Chantal Janzen as Annet
 Mike Reus as Pim
 Tygo Gernandt as Piet
 Roeland Fernhout as Ronald-Jan
 Cas Jansen as Pieter Slotemaker
 Rick Nicolet as Rie Slotemaker
 Huub Stapel as Anton Donkers
 Alwien Tulner as Sylvia
 Pleuni Touw as Jet Donkers
 Marcel Musters as Broer Hansen
 Christian Kmiotek as Jutka Djindjiz
 Dean Constantin as Colombian dealer
 Jeroen Spitzenberger as Jan de Geus
 Keith Davis as Hugo Duvall

Awards

External links
Trailer

2004 films
2004 thriller films
Films about drugs
Films about the illegal drug trade
Films about organized crime in the Netherlands
Dutch thriller films
2000s Dutch-language films
Films based on biographies
Films set in the Netherlands